Trần Ích Tắc (Chen Yiji, 1254–1329), or Prince Chiêu Quốc (Vietnamese: Chiêu Quốc vương / 昭國王), was a prince of Đại Việt, the fifth son of emperor Trần Thái Tông of the Trần dynasty, and the younger brother of the Emperor Trần Thánh Tông and grand chancellor Trần Quang Khải.

Before the invasion of Vietnam by the Yuan dynasty, Trần Ích Tắc was the most famous prince of Trần Thái Tông, known for his intelligence and broad knowledge. The mansion of Prince Chiêu Quốc in Thăng Long was also a renowned school of the capital. In the beginning of the Yuan-Tran war, Trần Ích Tắc surrendered to Kublai Khan's prince Toghan and thus became the highest-ranking official of the Trần dynasty to do so. However, later the Tran dynasty was ultimately able to defeat the Yuan invasion, partly because of the Tran dynasty's proficiency in Chinese gunpowder. The Tran and Yuan later restored diplomatic and trade relations, and Tran Ich Tac's name was restored over time—as a diplomat who solidified Tran-Yuan relations.

The Yuan dynasty supported Trần Ích Tắc to become king of Annam but were unable to, so Tran continued to live in Ezhou, Hubei, China, where he lived the rest of his days.

According to official Vietnamese records and Ngô Sĩ Liên, the Chinese leader Chen Youliang (陈友谅；Trần Hữu Lượng), founder of Chen Han in China, was the son of Trần Ích Tắc.

Biography
Trần Ích Tắc was born in 1254 as the fifth son of the Emperor Trần Thái Tông, he was entitled Prince Chiêu Quốc in May 1268. Besides his elder brother the Emperor Trần Thánh Tông, Prince Chiêu Quốc had two other famous brothers who were grand chancellor Prince Chiêu Minh (Chiêu Minh vương) Trần Quang Khải and Prince Chiêu Văn (Chiêu Văn vương) Trần Nhật Duật, both Trần Quang Khải and Trần Nhật Duật were important generals of the Trần dynasty during the second Mongol invasion of Đại Việt. Although Trần Quang Khải was a famous poet and Trần Nhật Duật was well known for his knowledge, the most famous prince of the Retired Emperor Thái Tông before the war was still Trần Ích Tắc. It was said that Prince Chiêu Quốc was not only intelligent but also fond of learning, besides a broad knowledge of history, art, literature, Trần Ích Tắc was even a skilled player of cuju and xiangqi. The palace of Prince Chiêu Quốc in Thăng Long was a renowned school of the capital where educated many scholars including some future prominent officials of the Trần dynasty such as Mạc Đĩnh Chi or Bùi Phóng.

In 1279, the Yuan dynasty had the decisive victory over the Song dynasty in the Battle of Yamen which marked the end of the Song dynasty and the total control of Kublai Khan over China. As a result, Kublai Khan began to expose his attempt to take over the southern countries like Đại Việt or Champa. In December 1284, the second Yuan's invasion of Đại Việt was opended under the command of Kublai Khan's prince Toghan. Đại Việt was attacked in two directions, Toghan himselft conducted the infantry invaded from the northern border while Yuan's navy under general Sogetu advanced from the southern border through Champa's territory.

In order to avoid the pressure of Yuan's force, the Retired Emperor Thánh Tông and the Emperor Nhân Tông decided to retreat from Thăng Long to Thanh Hóa on March 1 of Lunar calendar 1285. In the same month, Prince Chiêu Quốc Trần Ích Tắc, Marquis Văn Chiêu (Văn Chiêu hầu) Trần Lộng and several officials of the Trần dynasty surrendered to prince Toghan. According to Đại Việt sử kí toàn thư, Thái Tông was presaged the defection to the north of Trần Ích Tắc before his birth while Trần Ích Tắc also soon exposed his purpose of fighting his elder brother for the throne even by the foreign force. Therefore, on this occasion, Prince Chiêu Quốc decided to defect to the Yuan side with the hope that they would help him take over the position of Emperor of Đại Việt. The defection of Trần Ích Tắc and several high-ranking official of Trần royal court did have an adverse impact for the Trần dynasty in the beginning of the war of resistance, but Trần clan and royal court were still united by the effort of the Retired Emperor, the Emperor and other important figures like Trần Hưng Đạo, Trần Quang Khải, Trần Nhật Duật. The harmony of them was one of the main factors that led to the victory of the Trần dynasty over the Mongols' second invasion.

Right after the failed attempt in 1285, the Yuan dynasty began to prepare for the third major campaign against Đại Việt with the pretext of helping Trần Ích Tắc return as king of Annam. Their 1287 campaign was eventually ended by the Battle of Bạch Đằng on March 8 of Lunar calendar 1288, where Yuan navy was almost destroyed by the troops of Trần Hưng Đạo. In 1289, Trần Emperor issued an order in which the family name of every defected member of Trần clan was changed to Mai (枚), for example Trần Lộng (陳弄) was renamed as Mai Lộng (枚弄), being the only defected prince of Trần clan, Trần Ích Tắc was exempted from this order but he was called in historical accounts of the Trần dynasty by the name "Ả Trần", literally meant "the woman named Trần" to sacrastically crticizie Ích Tắc "was as coward as a women".

After the defeat of the Yuan dynasty in their third invasion of Đại Việt, Trần Ích Tắc continued his life in Ezhou, Hubei, he often appeared in provincial authority when Đại Việt ambassador went to China. One time he met the ambassador Nguyễn Đại Phạp (阮代乏) who was once a scribe in the palace of Trần Ích Tắc's brother, Prince Chiêu Đạo (Chiêu Đạo vương / 昭道王). When Trần Ích Tắc showed his scorn about the profession of Nguyễn Đại Phạp in the past, the ambassador of Đại Việt said: "Things changed. Đại Phạp, once a mere scribe for Prince Chiêu Đạo, now became an ambassador, just like the Mandarin [Ích Tắc], once a prince of the Emperor, now became a defector" ("Việc đời đổi thay, Đại Phạp trước vốn là tên biên chép cho Chiêu Đạo vương, nay là sứ giả, cũng như Bình chương xưa kia là con vua, nay lại là người đầu hàng giặc"). It seemed that Trần Ích Tắc felt ashamed after that event and he did not appear anymore when Đại Việt ambassador was there. He died in 1239 in foreign soil far from his homeland.

In 1354 Chen Youliang, the founder of the rebel Chen Han regime in the late Yuan dynasty tried to mobilise support from Đại Việt. However the Emperor Trần Dụ Tông refused to help him because the Trần dynasty needed to concentrate their force in the southern border against Champa. In the account about this event, Ngô Sĩ Liên noted that the Chinese leader Chen Youliang (陈友谅；Vietnamese: Trần Hữu Lượng), founder of Chen Han in China, was the son of Trần Ích Tắc.

Works
 Củng cực lạc ngâm tập (拱極樂吟集)

References

Reading 
 
 
 
 

1254 births
1329 deaths
Pretenders to the Vietnamese throne
Trần dynasty princes
Yuan dynasty politicians